Martin James Smith (born October 1963) is a British political activist. He is a former National Secretary of the Socialist Workers Party (SWP), a position he held from 2004 until January 2011. He is reported to have left the SWP in 2013 following accusations of the rape of a much younger female member of the party.

Smith joined the SWP in the 1980s and eventually become a member of the Central Committee. He was involved in disrupting talks at Acas in May 2010 between British Airways and the Unite trade union which he defended on Channel 4 News. He has also been involved at a senior level in Unite Against Fascism and Love Music Hate Racism. In September 2010, he was convicted of an assault on a police officer during the protest in October 2009 against British National Party leader Nick Griffin's appearance on Question Time. He was sentenced to a 12-month community order.

Smith is a former Director of Sherborne Publications Limited, the company that publishes the Socialist Worker, and of Love Music Hate Racism. At the National Conference in January 2011, he left the post of National Secretary of the SWP in favour of Charlie Kimber, who remains in this position.

Smith has been named as "Comrade Delta", accused of sexual assault and rape of women who were members of the SWP. According to Alex Callinicos and Dave Renton, disagreement within the party following this incident led to the resignation of 700 SWP members.

Selected publications
John Coltrane: Jazz, racism and resistance, the extended version. Redwords, 2003. 
Frank Sinatra: When ole blue eyes was a red. London: Bookmarks Publications, 2005. 
Why "British jobs for British workers" won't solve the crisis: Why we need jobs for all. London: Bookmarks Publications, 2009.

References

External links
Dream Deferred - Martin Smith’s blog
Smith talking about "Perspectives for Trade Union Struggle Today"
Smith at the Socialist Party and Socialist Workers Party debate.

1963 births
Living people
British people convicted of assault
Socialist Workers Party (UK) members